The Skyline is a residential building located in Woodberry Down, London. It is the tallest residential tower block in North London and a landmark of the Hackney skyline.

It was built by Berkeley Homes as part of a wider regeneration scheme in Woodberry Down. The regeneration scheme involved delivering over 5,500 new homes and represented an investment of c. £1bn. The regeneration started in 2004 when the Hackney Council adopted an outline masterplan and is due to complete in 2035 (31 years later). The scheme won the Project of the Year award in 2018 from the Royal Institution of Chartered Surveyors (RICS).

The Skyline is the tallest building at the centre of Woodberry Down. It is located to the east of Finsbury Park and Manor House station and on the north side of Woodberry Down Reservoirs, which consist in the West reservoir dedicated to sailing and the East reservoir dedicated to a nature reserve known as Woodberry Wetlands.

The construction of the Skyline began in 2013 and was completed in 2016. The tower is 101 meters in height and has 31 floors. It was designed by the architecture firm Rolfe Judd.

There are 139 apartments in the building. The tower includes a resident-only gym, 15-meter swimming pool and spa facilities and a Sainsbury's Local supermarket.

References

Residential skyscrapers in London
Residential buildings completed in 2016
Buildings and structures in the London Borough of Hackney
Hackney, London